Ozment is a surname. Notable people with the surname include:

Dennis Ozment (born 1945), American politician 
Steven Ozment (1939–2019), American historian

See also
Osment
Osmond (surname)